Apheloria is a genus of flat-backed millipedes in the family Xystodesmidae, occurring in the central and southeastern United States, and ranging as far north as southern Quebec, Canada. They are aposematically colored in black and contrasting reds and yellows, and some species in the Appalachian Mountains resemble species of Brachoria where they co-occur, a phenomenon known as Müllerian mimicry.

References

Polydesmida
Millipedes of North America